Yan Shing is one of the 18 constituencies in the North District, Hong Kong. The constituency returns one district councillor to the North District Council, with an election every four years.

Yan Shing constituency is loosely based on Yan Shing Court in Fanling with estimated population of 19,314.

Councillors represented

Election results

2010s

2000s

Notes

References

Fanling
Constituencies of Hong Kong
Constituencies of North District Council
2003 establishments in Hong Kong
Constituencies established in 2003